El Cajon Boulevard is a major east–west thoroughfare through San Diego, La Mesa and El Cajon, California. Before the creation of Interstate 8 it was the principal automobile route from San Diego to El Cajon, the Imperial Valley, and points east as U.S. Route 80; it is now signed as a business loop of Interstate 8.

Route description
The boulevard now consists of two disconnected portions, one in San Diego and La Mesa, and the other in El Cajon. The central section through La Mesa's Grossmont Pass was obliterated when Interstate 8 was built.

History
It was formerly part of U.S. Route 80, and became a business loop for Interstate 8 when U.S. Route 80 was decommissioned and replaced by the interstate. It is designated as a historic highway by the state of California. Only portions of what would become El Cajon Boulevard in both La Mesa and El Cajon were originally part of US 80. During a re-routing through San Diego onto Park Boulevard in 1929, the western portion of El Cajon Boulevard was added to US 80. The next section of El Cajon Boulevard added to US 80 was between La Mesa and El Cajon around 1940. Today, most of the latter route from La Mesa to El Cajon has been overlaid by I-8. The final part of El Cajon Boulevard to receive the US 80 designation was a small piece between Park Boulevard and Normal Street in the late 1940s early 1950s when US 80 was re-routed off Park Boulevard onto the new Cabrillo Freeway. US 80 ceased to exist legislatively within California after July 1, 1964.

It has been cited as a prime example of a commercial strip whose growth and development was shaped by the automobile, as opposed to the parallel University Avenue commercial strip whose growth was shaped by the trolley. Since El Cajon Boulevard was formerly the major route east from San Diego, there are many old hotels and motels on it. One of them, the Lafayette Hotel, is of considerable historic interest.

The first Jack in the Box restaurant was opened at 6270 El Cajon Boulevard by Robert O. Peterson in 1951. The site had originally been a drive-in diner called "Topsy's", later renamed "Oscar's" after Peterson's middle name, which was a classic drive-in where food was served by carhops to patrons in the parking lot. Jack in the Box was the first drive-through, with the innovation of a two-way intercom that allowed one car to place an order while another car was being served. Other restaurants had previously offered drive-up window service, but Jack in the Box was the first major chain to make drive-through windows the focus of its operation.

The street was the site of the El Cajon Boulevard Riot in August 1960, also known as the Drag Strip Riot, considered one of the first major youth riots of the 1960s. In the latter part of the 20th century, El Cajon Boulevard developed an unsavory reputation as a hotspot for prostitution.

Current conditions
The El Cajon Boulevard Business Improvement Association was formed in 1988 to improve physical and economic conditions along the 60 blocks of the boulevard between Park Boulevard and 54th Street. The association installed a large "The Boulevard" sign (see photo) to document the street's importance.

The College Area Business Improvement District was formed in 1996 and covered the area east of 54th Street to the La Mesa border at 73rd Street.  They instituted annual neighborhood events such as the "Boulevard BOO!" parade.

 to

Major intersections

References

External links
El Cajon Boulevard Business Improvement Association
College Area Business District

Boulevards in the United States
Streets in San Diego County, California
Transportation in San Diego
El Cajon, California
La Mesa, California
U.S. Route 80